Virgile Bruni (born 6 February 1989) is a French rugby union player. His usual position is as a Flanker, and he currently plays for Lyon OU in the Top 14. In January 2014, Bruni was called into the French squad for the 2014 Six Nations Championship.

References

External links
ESPN Profile

1989 births
Living people
RC Toulonnais players
French rugby union players
Sportspeople from Toulon
Lyon OU players
Rugby union locks